Evaristo Pérez de Castro y Colomera (26 October 1778, in Valladolid – 28 November 1849, in Madrid) was a Spanish politician and diplomat who served as Prime Minister of Spain from 3 February 1839 to 18 July 1840, and held other important offices such as Minister of State.

External links

|-

|-

Prime Ministers of Spain
Foreign ministers of Spain
1778 births
1848 deaths
Moderate Party (Spain) politicians
19th-century Spanish politicians